EPAC may refer to:
 rap guanine nucleotide exchange factor 3 (RAPGEF3), also known as exchange factor directly activated by cAMP 1 (EPAC1) or cAMP-regulated guanine nucleotide exchange factor
 Electrically Power Assisted Cycle, a term used in EU regulations for Electric bicycles